Kogaratsu is a comics series created by the Belgian comics creators Bosse (pseudonym of Serge Bosmans) and Michetz (pseudonym of Marc Degroide).

Overview
Kogaratsu is about a mercenary named Nakamura Kogaratsu. Caught in a fratricidal war, and confronted with superstitious farmers, Kogaratsu lives the way of the samurai: his honour, his weapons, and his love are the things dearest to him, in that exact order. And in the tumultuous Japan of the 17th century, honour is the small margin between life and death, wielding a weapon is a calling, and love is a weakness.

Publication History 
It was first published in the French Spirou magazine in 1982. The success of the series, written by Bosse and illustrated by Michetz, inspired then-illustrator and script writer Bosse to give up illustrating in order to focus solely on script-writing.

Fourteen volumes of Kogaratsu have been published by Dupuis beginning in 1985:

De bloedlotus (1985) 
De schat van de Eta (1986)

Translations

English
The only English translations to date are that of the first volume. UK-based Acme Press published it in 1987 as Kogaratsu: The Lotus of Blood, and three years later the US-based Catalan Communications published it as Kogaratsu: The Bloody Lotus under their ComCat Comics imprint.

Catalan had planned in 1991 to publish the next two volumes, Treasure of Eta and Spring of Betrayals, even obtaining ISBN numbers for them. However, the company entered bankruptcy the same year and the volumes never materialized.

French
French versions have been published by the same Dupuis.

0. "Volume Zero" titled Le Pont de nulle part was published in 1991.
Le Mon au lotus de sang (1991) 
Le Trésor des Étas (1991)
Le Printemps écartelé (1989)
Le Dos du tigre(1992)
Par-delà les cendres (1994)
L'Homme sur la vague (1995)
L'Autre moitié du ciel (1997)
Sous le regard de la lune (1999)
La Strategie Des Phalenees (2000)
Rouge ultime (2002)
Fournaise (2008)
Le protocole du Mal (2010)
Taro (2014)

A multi-volume compilation, L'Intégrale - Tome 1, was published in 2010.

German
German translations have been issued by Finix Comics e.V. They count the prequel/Volume Zero as number one, pushing the subsequent volumes' numbering down by one. (For example, the volume Taro is the 13th French but 14th German title.)

(volume 12) Glutofen (2014)
(volume 13) Das Protokoll des Bösen (2015)
(volume 14) Taro (2015)

Spanish
Spanish multi-volume compilations have been issued by Ponent Mon Comic.

(compilation 1)
(compilation 2)
(compilation 3)

References

External links 
  (Depuis)
  (Acme Press)

1982 comics debuts
Dupuis titles
Martial arts comics
Historical comics